John Henry Patrick Avison,  (April 25, 1915November 30, 1983) was a Canadian conductor and pianist. From 1938 to 1980, he was the founding conductor of the CBC Vancouver Chamber Orchestra. He was a longtime member of the Vancouver Symphony Orchestra (VSO) and was married to VSO violinist Angelina Avison. In 1978 he was made a Member of the Order of Canada, Canada's highest civilian honour, and in 1980 he was awarded the Canadian Music Council Medal.

Born in Vancouver, Avison earned an Associates diploma from the Toronto Conservatory of Music in 1929. During the early 1930s he studied in his native city with J.D.A. Tripp (piano) and Allard de Ridder (conducting). He earned a Bachelor of Arts from the University of British Columbia in 1935 and a Bachelor of Music from the University of Washington in 1936. During World War II he served in the Canadian Army, after which he pursued further music studies at the Juilliard School (1946), Columbia University (1946–1947), and Yale University (1947). At the latter school he was a pupil of Paul Hindemith.

See also

Music of Canada
Canadian classical music
List of Canadian musicians

References
Citations

External links
 John Avison at The Canadian Encyclopedia

1915 births
1983 deaths
Members of the Order of Canada
The Royal Conservatory of Music alumni
University of British Columbia alumni
University of Washington College of Arts and Sciences alumni
Yale School of Music alumni
Columbia University School of the Arts alumni
Male conductors (music)
Musicians from Vancouver
Pupils of Paul Hindemith
20th-century classical pianists
20th-century Canadian pianists
20th-century Canadian conductors (music)
20th-century Canadian male musicians
Canadian expatriates in the United States